Lough Eske railway station served Druminin in County Donegal, Ireland.  The station is near Lough Eske one of the scenic delights of the area.

The station opened on 25 April 1882 on the West Donegal Railway line from Stranorlar to Donegal.

It closed on 1 January 1960.

Routes

References

Disused railway stations in County Donegal
Railway stations opened in 1882
Railway stations closed in 1960